Ynysybwl Rugby Football Club is a Welsh rugby union team based in Ynysybwl. Ynysybwl RFC plays in the Welsh Rugby Union, Division One East League and is a feeder club for the Cardiff Blues.

Ynysbwl RFC was established in 1880. In the years between 1945 and 1955 Ynysybwl played in the Glamorgan League and Cup with other local clubs such as Pontypridd RFC, Ebbw Vale RFC and Glamorgan Wanderers. From the 1980s the club joined the Mid District League.

Club honours
1998/99 Glamorgan County Silver Ball Trophy - Winners
2005/06 Glamorgan County Silver Ball Trophy - Winners
2005/06 Glamorgan County President's Cup - Winners

Notable past players
  Garin Jenkins
  Staff Jones
  Dale McIntosh
  Tommy Scourfield
  Adam Thomas (rugby union)

References

Rugby clubs established in 1880
1880 establishments in Wales
Welsh rugby union teams